LIM domain only protein 7 is a protein that in humans is encoded by the LMO7 gene.

This gene encodes a protein containing a calponin homology (CH) domain, a PDZ domain, and a LIM domain. An F-box (FBX) domain is present in alternative splice variants. Members of the LIM protein family carry the LIM domain, a unique cysteine-rich zinc-binding domain. Members of the FBX protein family are involved in protein-protein interactions. The encoded protein may be involved in protein-protein interactions. Multiple alternative splice variants have been described but their full-length sequences have not been determined.

References

Further reading